Band III is the name of the range of radio frequencies within the very high frequency (VHF) part of the electromagnetic spectrum from 174 to 240 megahertz (MHz).  It is primarily used for radio and television broadcasting.  It is also called high-band VHF, in contrast to Bands I and II.

Broadcast Television

North America

The band is subdivided into seven channels for television broadcasting, each occupying 6 MHz.

Europe

European Band III allocations vary from country to country, with channel widths of 7 or 8 MHz. 

The standard channel allocations for European countries that use System B with 7 MHz channel spacing are as follows:

The Irish (8 MHz) system is shown below.

Oceania
Australia has allocated 8 channels in Band III for digital television, each with 7 MHz bandwidth.

Russia and other former members of OIRT 

Russian analog television is transmitted using System D with 8 MHz channel bandwidth.

Radio

The band came into use for radio broadcasting at the turn of the 21st century and is used for Digital Audio Broadcasting.

It is subdivided into a number of frequency blocks:

Worldwide usage

Europe

In the UK and part of Ireland, Band III was originally used for monochrome 405-line television; however, this was discontinued by the mid-1980s. Other European countries (including Ireland) continued to use Band III for analogue 625-line colour television.

Digital television in the DVB-T standard can be used in conjunction with VHF Band III and is used as such in some places. The use of sub-band 2 and sub-band 3 band for Digital Audio Broadcasting is now being widely adopted. Sub-band 1 is used for MPT-1327 trunked PMR radio, remote wireless microphones and PMSE links.

North America
In North America, use of the band for television broadcasts is still widespread. Favorable propagation characteristics and reasonable power limits (up to 65 kW for full-power digital television, versus 20 kW or less on VHF Band I) has meant that many US broadcasters elected to move their full-power ATSC stations from UHF frequencies to Band III VHF when all full-power NTSC analog television services in the US shut down in 2009.

References 

Broadcast engineering
Radio spectrum